Southern Anung  (Lisu: Fuche Naw; Mandarin: 阿侬语 Anong), is a Sino-Tibetan language spoken by the Nung people in Fugong County, China and Kachin State, Myanmar. The Anong language is closely related to the Derung and Rawang languages. Most of the Anung speakers in China have shifted to Lisu although the speakers are being classified as Nu nationality. The northern Anung people speak a dialect of Derung which is also called Anung (Derung: Vnung [ə31 nuŋ53]) actively, but is not the same Anung discussed in this article.

Demographics

China
Anong is spoken by over 7,000 people in China in the following townships (Sun & Liu 2005).
Shangpa 上帕镇: 2,200 people
Lijia 里甲乡: 1,100 people
Lumadeng 鹿马登乡: 2,100 people
Lishadi 利沙底乡: 2,200 people

Myanmar
There could be many more Anong speakers in neighboring Kachin State, Myanmar, although their current status is unknown,

Naw (Anong) in Myanmar, over 5000 people
Putao 2000 people
Myitkyina 3000 people
Tanai 500 people

In Myanmar, Anong is considered one of the clans of the Lisu family. In 2014, in the Myanmar census, the government did an official catalogue of all the ethnic groups. In that census, the Naw people were identified as one of the ethnic people in the Kachin group. Currently, the number of Anong speakers are increasing. In Myitkyina town and Putao town, there are literacy and language trainings in every year. Naw is still mixed with the Lisu population. The majority of Anong speakers in Myanmar are mainly found in Kachin State, specifically Myitkyina township, Putao township, Naungmun township, Machanbaw township, Tannai township, and Khaunglangphu township. Some Naw people live in Shan State but it is not clear whether they still use Anong or not. There are also many living in different cities such as Yangon, Khanti, and Taunggyi, etc. The language use situation is still low. Therefore, Anong language is an endangered language. Besides in China and Myanmar, there are Anong people in Thailand and India.

According to the Anong Cultural and Literature Committee in Myanmar (2009:1) Naw Pha used to be a big clan consisting at least 23 family groups. Among them, Nawsu, one of the biggest family groups under Naw Pha clan, consists of Zi Li Naw, Sa Wa Naw, Ga Meu Sa Naw, Tho Kyay Naw, Nyay Gu Naw, Yi To Lo Naw and Jay Kho Naw. Although the Anong Cultural and Literature Committee in Myanmar says that Nawsu is one of the Anong family groups, the Nawsu language is totally different from Anong. Actually, Nawsu is closely related to the Lisu language. Another of the biggest in the Naw Pha family is Kha Li Zi (forefather of this group) which consists of the families of La Meu Teu Naw, Kyi Zo Lo Naw, La Wu Naw, Co Lo Naw, Geu Jay Naw, Mi Kaw Naw, Chi Zu Naw, Mi Chey Naw, Da Phu Lu Naw, Li To Naw, Li Beu Naw, Kwa Zu Naw, Ta Ga Naw, and La Pheu Naw.

Phonology

Consonant 
Nung has 43 single consonants.

References 

This book in English:

Wu, Nye. 2013. A Sociolinguistic Study of the Vitality of Anung (Anong) In Myanmar. Master’s thesis, Payap University.
Shintani, Tadahiko. 2018. The Khwingsang language. Linguistic survey of Tay cultural area, no. 113. Tokyo: Research Institute for Languages and Cultures of Asia and Africa (ILCAA).

Nungish languages
Endangered Sino-Tibetan languages